DragCon is a drag exposition or fan convention:

It could refer to:

RuPaul's DragCon LA, the first expo started in 2015
Digital DragCon, held online in 2020 in lieu of the LA one canceled due to COVID-19 pandemic
RuPaul's DragCon NYC, started in 2017
RuPaul's DragCon UK, starting in 2020
DragCon South Africa, DragCon SA, a company presenting drag queen shows including touring Drag Race performers
DragWorld, a London, England convention 
Austin International Drag Festival's Kingfest, a drag king convention 
King Con in Ohio, a drag king convention